Shanxi Longjin Football Club is a defunct Chinese football club that participated in the China League Two. The team was based in Taiyuan, Shanxi.

History
Hebei Lion F.C. was founded on November 2, 2015 in the city of Cangzhou, in Hebei Province, and started to participate in China Amateur Football League to aim for promotion to China League Two. After failing to make it out of group stages 2 seasons in a row in the 2016 and 2017 seasons, the club moved to Taiyuan, Shanxi Province, changed its name to Shanxi Metropolis F.C., and started the year by winning the 2018 Shanxi Super League by beating Shanxi Zhisheng in the finals. In their third attempt for promotion, they participated in 2018 Chinese Champions League and although narrowly missing promotion by being eliminated by Hangzhou Wuyue Qiantang at quarter-finals, then losing to Lhasa Urban Construction Investment 1–2 at home, they were later admitted into 2019 China League Two to fill vacancy left by withdrawn team Dalian Transcendence.

In March 2020, they changed their name to Shanxi Longjin F.C.

The club was dissolved after 2021 season.

Name history
2015–2017 Hebei Lion F.C. 河北信友
2018–2019 Shanxi Metropolis F.C. 山西信都
2020–2021 Shanxi Longjin F.C. 山西龙晋

Results
All-time league rankings

As of the end of 2019 season.

Key
<div>

 Pld = Played
 W = Games won
 D = Games drawn
 L = Games lost
 F = Goals for
 A = Goals against
 Pts = Points
 Pos = Final position

 DNQ = Did not qualify
 DNE = Did not enter
 NH = Not Held
 WD = Withdrawal
 – = Does Not Exist
 R1 = Round 1
 R2 = Round 2
 R3 = Round 3
 R4 = Round 4

 F = Final
 SF = Semi-finals
 QF = Quarter-finals
 R16 = Round of 16
 Group = Group stage
 GS2 = Second Group stage
 QR1 = First Qualifying Round
 QR2 = Second Qualifying Round
 QR3 = Third Qualifying Round

References

External links
Soccerway

Defunct football clubs in China
Association football clubs established in 2018
Association football clubs disestablished in 2022
Sport in Shanxi
2018 establishments in China
2022 disestablishments in China